Amphelictus is a genus of beetles in the family Cerambycidae, containing the following species:

 Amphelictus aibussu Martins & Monne, 2005
 Amphelictus aielloae Eya & Chemsak, 2003
 Amphelictus astales Martins & Monne, 2005
 Amphelictus bicolor Chemsak & Linsley, 1964
 Amphelictus brevidens Chemsak & Linsley, 1964
 Amphelictus caliginosus Martins & Monne, 2005
 Amphelictus castaneus Chemsak & Linsley, 1964
 Amphelictus cribripennis Chemsak Linsley, 1964
 Amphelictus curoei Eya & Chemsak, 2003
 Amphelictus fortunenesis Eya & Chemsak, 2003
 Amphelictus fuscipennis Eya & Chemsak, 2003
 Amphelictus gilloglyi Eya & Chemsak, 2003
 Amphelictus hispidus Martins & Monne, 2005
 Amphelictus hovorei Eya & Chemsak, 2003
 Amphelictus melas Bates, 1884
 Amphelictus milleri Chemsak & Linsley, 1964
 Amphelictus panamensis Chemsak & Linsley, 1964
 Amphelictus parvipunctus Eya & Chemsak, 2003
 Amphelictus potiaiuba Martins & Monne, 2005
 Amphelictus rugiscapus Fuchs, 1976
 Amphelictus scabrosus Eya & Chemsak, 2003
 Amphelictus secus Martins & Monne, 2005

References

 
Cerambycini